Albert Hainz (1 October 1964) is an Austrian former cyclist. He won the Austrian National Road Race Championships in 1988.

References

External links
 

1964 births
Living people
Austrian male cyclists
People from Braunau am Inn
Sportspeople from Upper Austria